AK Borac or Atletski klub Borac Banjaluka (Serbian Cyrillic: АК Бopaц Бања Лука) is an athletics club from Banja Luka, Republika Srpska, Bosnia and Herzegovina. It competes in both the men's and women's national leagues under Atletski Savez Bosne I Hercegovine.

History

Notable athletes
 Dušan Babić
 Lucia Kimani
 Nataša Petrović
 Milan Radulović
 Željko Petrović

References

External links
Sport association Borac 
Athletes clubs data base 
County Athletics Association of Bosnia and Herzegovina 

Sport in Republika Srpska